The Tonyukuk inscriptions, also called the Bain Tsokto inscriptions are Turkic inscriptions of the 8th century located in modern-day Mongolia. They are the oldest written attestations of the Turkic language family, predating the Orkhon inscriptions (Khöshöö Tsaidam monuments) by several years.

Geography

History
Bain Tsokto inscriptions are about Tonyukuk, the counselor of four Turkic khagans -- Ilterish Khagan, Kapaghan Khagan, Inel Khagan and Bilge Khagan -- of the Second Turkic Khaganate. He died in the 720s. Unlike the two other Orkhon inscriptions which were erected after the hero had died, Bain Tsokto inscriptions were erected by Tonyukuk himself around the year 716. (His deeds after 716 had not been narrated.) The narrator is Tonyukuk. The inscriptions were inscribed on two steles. The writing, which proceeds vertically from top to bottom, is in the Old Turkic alphabet.

Summary of the text

1st stele (35 lines) 

West side: The revolt of Turks against the Tang dynasty in 681. (After the Tang subjugated the Turks in 630)
South side: War against Oghuz Turks
East side: Capture of 23 cities and plan to counterattack against a possible alliance of the neighbors (Tang, Onoq and Yenisei Kirghiz) 
North side: Defeat of Yenisei Kirghiz (north) and campaign to Turgesh (Onoq territory, west)

2nd stele (27 lines)
West side: Battle of Bolchu (711) against Turgesh and annexation of Onoq territory (roughly present Turkestan)
 South side: Annexation of Temir Kapig, Ilterish Qaghan’s 7 campaigns to Khitan people (east), 17 campaigns to Tang dynasty (south), 5 campaigns to Oghuz Turks 
East side: (Tonyukuk praises himself on his valuable assistance to khagans and adds that he gets old)
North side: (Epilogue) After the victories, Turks and Sir (people) live happily.

See also
Göktürks
Tariat inscriptions

References

External links
Turkbitig Inscriptions

Archaeology of Mongolia
8th century in Asia
8th-century inscriptions
Göktürk inscriptions